Aspasius of Ravenna (fl. 3rd century AD) was a Roman sophist and rhetorician.

Life
He was the son or pupil of the rhetorician Demetrianus. 
He taught rhetoric in Rome, and filled the chair of rhetoric founded by Vespasian. 
He was secretary to the emperor Maximinus Thrax. 
His orations, which were praised for their style, are lost.

Notes

3rd-century Romans
Ancient Roman rhetoricians